Piotrków may refer to the following places in Poland:

Piotrków Voivodeship, a former administrative division in Poland (1975-1998)
Piotrków County, an administrative division in Poland
Piotrków Trybunalski, a city in Piotrków County (and formerly in Piotrków Voivodeship), Poland
Piotrków Kujawski, a city in Gmina Piotrków Kujawski in Radziejów County, Kuyavian-Pomeranian Voivodeship
Piotrków Pierwszy, a village in Gmina Jabłonna in Lublin County, Lublin Voivodeship
Piotrków Drugi, a village in Gmina Jabłonna
Piotrków-Kolonia, a village in Gmina Jabłonna